Thank You Camellia is the third studio album and second major-label album by American singer-songwriter Kris Allen. It was released on May 22, 2012.

Background
Allen confirmed on April 4, 2012, via a WhoSay Twitter-based fan interview (and reiterated in following interviews) that the album's title is a reference to the home that he shared with friends from his home state of Arkansas while living in Los Angeles, where he recorded the majority of the songs featured on his sophomore release.

Reception
Entertainment Weekly'''s Grady Smith gave the album a positive (B+) review. Ceding that the songs may come off "downright Amish" compared to contemporaries on the pop charts, Smith noted that "Allen delivers his lyrics with an earnest confidence (and occasional swagger) that keeps his songs from becoming treacly," concluding that the album was "a cohesive, warmhearted charmer." USA Today's Brian Mansfield also described it as "warmhearted" with "charming flourishes." People gave the album 3 out of 4 stars, calling it a "smoothly and surely executed . . . winner."

Singles
The only single from the album is "The Vision of Love", which was released digitally on March 26, 2012.

Live performances
Allen performed new material from his forthcoming album for the first time at a sold out show at The Mint in Los Angeles on February 9, 2012.

Allen performed "The Vision of Love" and other new material from his forthcoming album at the Live in the Vineyard'' festival on April 13 at the Uptown Theater, in Napa, California. The show also featured Jason Mraz, Mayer Hawthorne, Mat Kearney, and more.

He also performed at Mix 94.1's Pet-a-Palooza in Las Vegas on April 21, 2012. On May 19, 2012, Allen performed songs from the record on 96.9 WINK FM's Spring Fling. He also covered "She Works Hard for the Money", paying respect to the late Donna Summer.

Track listing
The track list was revealed on April 10, 2012.

Release formats
 CD, Vinyl – containing the 11-track album.
 Deluxe Digital version – 14-track edition containing the album plus three bonus tracks.
 CD Fan version – 19-track edition containing the album plus three bonus tracks and five acoustic recordings.

Credits and personnel
Performance credits
All vocals – Kris Allen
Background vocals – Kevin Kadish, Boots Ottestad
Featured artist – Meiko

Instruments

Bass – Kris Allen, David Baron, Jonathan Berry, Kevin Kadish, Curt Schnedier
Drums – Carlos de la Garza, Ryland Steen, Kevin Weaver
Electric slide guitar – Bruce Watson
Fender Rhodes – David Baron
Guitars – Kris Allen, Jonathan Berry, David Givhan, Kevin Kadish, David Levita, Boots Ottestad
Hammond B3 – David Baron
Keyboards – Zac Rae
Mandolin – Bruce Watson
Percussion – Kris Allen
Piano – Francois-Paul Aiche, Kris Allen, Kevin Kadish, Boots Ottestad
Polysix – Kevin Kadish
Shaker – Kevin Weaver
Strings – David Baron
Tambourine – Kevin Weaver
Viola – Chris Woods
Violin – Chris Woods

Production

A&R – Rob Inadomi, Myles Lewis, Keith Naftaly, Iain Pirie
Assistant – Ryan Lipman
Art directors – Maria P. Marulanda
Design – Maria P. Marulanda
Creative director – Erwin Gorostiza
Engineer – J. Bonilla, Jorge Costa, Carlos de la Garza, Ryan Gillmor, Kevin Kadish, Gavin MacKillop, Tim Pagnotta, Daniele Rivera, Curt Schnedier
Assistant engineer – Daniele Rivera
Instrumentation – Adam Messinger
Groomer – Su Han
Management – Josh Klemme
Mastering – Chris Gehringer
Mixers – Phil Tan, Jon Zook
Producers – J. Bonilla, Kevin Kadish, Maison & Dragen, Adam Messinger, Nasri, Boots Ottestad, Tim Pagnotta, Curt Schnedier
Vocal producer – JP Clark
Programming – Brandon Belsky
Drum programming – Kevin Kadish
Photographer – Leann Mueller
Sound design – Kevin Kadish
Studio assistant – Jared Woodard
Stylist – Scott Free

Release dates

References

2012 albums
Kris Allen albums
RCA Records albums
19 Recordings albums